Bara Chaturi (also written as Barachaturi) is a village in Suri I CD Block in Suri Sadar subdivision of Birbhum district in the Indian state of West Bengal.

Geography

Location
The Mayurakshi flows past the village. The office of Khatanga Gram Panchayat is situated in Bara Chaturi.

Demographics
As per the 2011 Census of India, Bara Chaturi had a total population of 173 of which 97 (56%) were males and 76 (44%) were females. Population below 6 years was 10. The total number of literates in Bara Chaturi was 105 (64.42% of the population over 6 years).

Transport
The Suri-Dumka Road passes through Bara Chaturi.

Healthcare
Barachaturi Block Primary Health Centre (PO Khatanga) has 15 beds. In 2012, the average monthly patients attending Bara Chaturi BPHC were 2,323 and average monthly admissions were  24. It handled 90 emergency admissions.

References

Villages in Birbhum district